The 2007–08 Ugandan Super League was the 41st season of the official Ugandan football championship, the top-level football league of Uganda.

Overview
The 2007–08 Uganda Super League was contested by 18 teams and was won by Kampala City Council FC, while Masaka Local Council FC, CRO FC, Ediofe Hills FC, Maroons FC and Biharwe FC were relegated.

League standings

Leading goalscorer
The top goalscorers in the 2007–08 season were Brian Umony (Kampala City Council FC) and Olobo Bruno (Police FC) with 15 goals each.

Footnotes

External links
 Uganda - List of Champions - RSSSF (Hans Schöggl)
 Ugandan Football League Tables - League321.com

Ugandan Super League seasons
Uganda Super League
Super League